is a former Grand Prix motorcycle road racer. Aoki began his Grand Prix career in 1990 and won his first and only Grand Prix at the 250cc Malaysian Grand Prix. His best season was in 1997, when he finished third in the 500cc world championship behind Mick Doohan and Tadayuki Okada. In 2009, he teamed with Daisaku Sakai and Kazuki Tokudome on a Suzuki GSX-R1000 to win the Suzuka 8 Hours endurance race. He is the oldest of three Aoki brothers who have competed in motorcycle Grand Prix races.

Grand Prix career results
Points system from 1988 to 1992:

Points system from 1993 onwards:

(key) (Races in bold indicate pole position, races in italics indicate fastest lap)

References

Japanese motorcycle racers
250cc World Championship riders
500cc World Championship riders
Suzuki MotoGP riders
1971 births
Living people
MotoGP World Championship riders